Stefano Torrisi (born 7 May 1971) is an Italian former footballer who played as a defender.

Club career
Born in Ravenna, Torrisi played for Italian clubs Modena, Ravenna Calcio, Reggiana, Torino, Bologna, Reggina, and Parma throughout his career, and also had spells in Spain and France with Atlético Madrid and Marseille respectively. During his time with Reggiana he was briefly sold to Milan in the summer of 1994, but only featured in friendly matches for the club before being sold to Torino in June.

International career
Along with two other debutants, Giampiero Maini and Eusebio Di Francesco, Torrisi was named in Italy's squad for 1997 Tournoi de France under manager Cesare Maldini. At the tournament he made his first and only appearance for the national team in a 2–2 draw with France.

Style of play
Torrisi was a versatile and reliable defender, who was capable of playing both as a sweeper (a position which he occupied in his early career) and as a centre-back (a position in which he played in his later career), due to his good technique and ability in the air.

After retirement
Following his retirement, Torrisi worked as a pundit and later also played amateur football with Loops Ribelle in the Prima Categoria, winning the division title. He subsequently took part in an over-40 Senior Tour tennis tournament in Turkey. As of 2022, Torrisi runs a scouting agency in Prague.

Honours
Modena
Serie C1: 1989–90

Ravenna
Serie C2: 1991–92
Serie C1: 1992–93

Bologna
Serie B: 1995–96

Parma
Supercoppa Italiana: 1999

References

External links
 
 Stefano Torrisi at Weltfussball.de  
 

1971 births
Living people
Italian footballers
Italy international footballers
Serie A players
Serie B players
Modena F.C. players
Ravenna F.C. players
Reggina 1914 players
Torino F.C. players
Bologna F.C. 1909 players
Atlético Madrid footballers
La Liga players
Parma Calcio 1913 players
Olympique de Marseille players
Ligue 1 players
Italian expatriate footballers
Expatriate footballers in France
Expatriate footballers in Spain
Association football defenders
Italian expatriate sportspeople in France
Italian expatriate sportspeople in the Czech Republic
Italian expatriate sportspeople in Spain